The 2006–07 Russian Superleague season was the 11th season of the Russian Superleague, the top level of ice hockey in Russia. 19 teams participated in the league, and Metallurg Magnitogorsk won the championship.

Standings

Playoffs

External links
Season on hockeyarchives.ru

Russian Superleague seasons
1